Skull Session is an album by American jazz composer/arranger Oliver Nelson featuring performances recorded in 1975 for the Flying Dutchman label.

Reception

AllMusic awarded the album 3½ stars, stating: "For this interesting session, Oliver Nelson (who wrote and arranged all eight numbers) utilizes electric keyboards and rock and funk rhythms in what is still a big-band jazz date".

Track listing

Personnel
Oliver Nelson - alto saxophone, arranger, conductor
Bobby Bryant, Oscar Brashear (tracks 1-6 & 8) - trumpet, flugelhorn 
Paul Hubinon, Buddy Childers - trumpet (tracks 2-4)
Grover Mitchell, Richard Nash, Chauncey Welsch - trombone (tracks 2-4)
Maurice Spears - bass trombone (tracks 2-4)
Vincent DeRosa, Davis Allan Duke - French horn (tracks 2-4)
Don Waldrop - tuba (tracks 2-4)
Jerome Richardson - alto saxophone, soprano saxophone, clarinet, flute
Bud Shank - tenor saxophone, alto saxophone, clarinet, alto flute (tracks 2-4, 6 & 7)
Buddy Collette - tenor saxophone, clarinet, tenor flute, alto flute (tracks 2-4, 6 & 7)
Billy Green - tenor saxophone (tracks 1-5 & 8)
Billy Perkins - tenor saxophone, baritone saxophone, bass clarinet (tracks 1-5 & 8)
John Kelson Jr. - baritone saxophone, bass clarinet (tracks 6 & 7)
Lonnie Liston Smith - electric piano (tracks 1-5 & 8)
Mike Wofford - electric piano, harpsichord, synthesizer, piano 
Laurindo Almeida - guitar (tracks 6 & 7)
Dennis Budimir, Lee Ritenour - electric guitar (tracks 1, 5 & 8)
Chuck Domanico - bass, electric bass
Shelly Manne - drums, percussion
Jimmy Gordon - drums (tracks 1, 5 & 7)
Willie Bobo - percussion

References

1975 albums
Albums arranged by Oliver Nelson
Albums conducted by Oliver Nelson
Albums produced by Bob Thiele
Flying Dutchman Records albums
Oliver Nelson albums